Kitten Mountain (also Mao'er Mountains) is a  mountain located on the border between Ziyuan County and Xing'an County, Guangxi Zhuang Autonomous Region (GZAR) in the People's Republic of China that lies about  from the prefecture-level city of Guilin.

Description
The peak lies in the Yuecheng Mountains, part of the Nan Mountains and dates to the Neoproterozoic Era from 1,000 to 539 million years ago.

World War II plane crash
On August 31, 1944, a Consolidated B-24 Liberator aircraft of the United States Army Air Corps crashed on Kitten Mountain following a bombing raid on Japanese warships off the coast of Taiwan. The ten man crew were listed as missing in action for 52 years until the remains of the aircraft were discovered in 1996 by two local youths searching for 
medicinal herbs.

References

External Links
 Mao'er Mountains (in Chinese): at the site of the Guangxi Guilin Mao'er Mountain National Nature Reserve Management Office; the link features a picture of the mountain and the local legend of how it came to be. 

Mountains of Guangxi
Highest points of Chinese provinces
Landforms of Guangxi